The vice president of Gabon is a political position in Gabon. The vice president's role is to assist the president and the person serving as vice president has no interim role in the event of a power vacuum.

The current vice president is Rose Christiane Raponda who assumed the office on 9 January 2023 after it had been vacant for almost 4 years since May 2019.

History of the office

Original office
Changes in the Constitution of 1966 made the vice president the automatic successor of the president in case of a vacancy in the latter office. Albert-Bernard Bongo was appointed as vice president in 1966 with the expectation that he would constitutionally succeed the ailing president Leon M'ba, and he did so following M'ba's death in November 1967. In April 1975 the position of vice president was abolished and its functions were given to the Prime Minister.

Restored office
The position of vice president was restored in 1997 as a position appointed by the president of Gabon. The vice president acted as the president's deputy, but was not the constitutional successor of the president in the event of a vacancy in the latter office. President Ali Bongo Ondimba abolished the office in October 2009.

Description of the office
The president of the republic is assisted by a vice president of the republic.

The vice president of the republic is nominated by the president of the republic, who can terminate his or her duties, after the consultation of the presidents of the two chambers of Parliament. The vice president of the republic may be chosen from the members of Parliament, or outside the legislature.

The functions of the vice president of the republic are incompatible with the exercise of all other public and private functions of a lucrative character.

The vice president of the republic takes the oath of office before the president of the republic and in the presence of the Constitutional Court, according to the terms below:

The vice president of the republic stands in for the president of the republic in the duties that the president delegates to him.

The manner in which the present article may be applied is fixed by an organic law.

The functions of the vice president of the republic end at the issuing of the proclamation of the next presidential election results by the Constitutional Court and in the case of a vacancy in the presidential office for whatever reason, or a permanent impairment of the current president of the republic.

The vice president of the republic is a member of the Council of Ministers by right. If appropriate, the vice president may substitute the president of the republic through express authorization and a defined order of business.

List of officeholders
Political parties

See also
President of Gabon
First Lady of Gabon
Prime Minister of Gabon
List of colonial governors of Gabon
Politics of Gabon

References

External links
1991 Constitution of Gabon (as amended in 2011)

Politics of Gabon
 
Gabon
1961 establishments in Gabon
1997 establishments in Gabon
2017 establishments in Gabon
Gabon politics-related lists